Johannes Erm (born March 26, 1998) is an Estonian decathlete.

He is the 2019 NCAA champion in decathlon.

Career
Johannes Erm was born March 26 [1998] in Tartu. He started school in Tallinn Secondary School of Science. In his youth he played football in the Estonian club FC Flora under the supervision of Priit Adamson. In 2011, he transitioned into track and field and started training with his trainer at the time Holger Peel. In 2017 he finished high school and went to study mechanical engineering in University of Georgia. His coach became Petros Kyprianou. In 2021 his coach changed to James Thomas.

He was 11th at the 2020 Olympics with 8213 points.

International competitions

Outdoor records

Results of the personal best decathlon

Indoor records

Results of the personal best heptathlon

References

External links

1998 births
Living people
Sportspeople from Tartu
Estonian decathletes
Georgia Bulldogs track and field athletes
Estonian expatriate sportspeople in the United States
Athletes (track and field) at the 2020 Summer Olympics
Olympic athletes of Estonia
World Athletics Championships athletes for Estonia